Awbeg River is a river in the southern part of Ireland.  It is a tributary of the Blackwater River and flows into that larger river at a point in County Cork.  Its name comes from the Irish Abha Bheag ("small river", a slightly older form than the modern Irish name).

The course

There are two contributories of the Awbeg.  The first rises in County Limerick as the Gralgne River and enters County Cork a half mile north-east of Ardskeagh Cross Roads, then flows west under a railroad bridge and south under Farran bridge on the Buttevant/Charlevllle road.

The second branch rises about two miles north of Liscarroll and flows south and then north and west under Annagh Bridge to join the first branch at Scart Bridge.

From there, the river flows south through Buttevant and east through Doneraile, turns south near Shanballymore and through Castletownroche to enter the Blackwater at Poulcormac near Bridgetown Abbey.

Ecology

North of Buttevant the river flows through flat agricultural land, while south of Buttevant the river generally flows through a narrow, steep-sided valley with wooded sides. For the most part the river flows over Carboniferous limestone. The river supports a range of plant species including dropwort, pondweed, club-rush, water-cress and Ranunculus.  The river is largely fringed by a narrow strip of marsh vegetation, dominated by reed-canary grass. The Awbeg is a breeding ground for otters and supports a significant population of Atlantic salmon. The site supports a population of white-clawed crayfish, a threatened species.

Old bridges

Blake's Bridge, an old stone bridge over the Awbeg River in Buttevant, was widened at some time in the past.  The masonry is unusual similar to that found at a nearby Franciscan abbey.

The ancient clapper bridge near Ballybeg Abbey was erected in the 13th century by the Augustinian Friars of Ballybeg for convenience in crossing the Awbeg to their mill and lands beyond. It is constructed of huge slabs of limestone that are about 3 m long, equally wide, and each weighing a ton.  The transverse slabs measure 2.7 m to 3.0 m in length and are wide and thick in proportion and each weighs a tonne.

Knockanare Well
Knockanare Well is situated on the left bank of the Awbeg river, about a half-mile east of Buttevant and southeast of the Ballyhoura Mountains.

Gentle Mullagh

Edmund Spenser referred to the Awbeg as "the gentle Mullagh" (or Mulla) and resided at Kilcolman Castle in its vicinity.

References

Awbeg